Omicron Lupi (ο Lup) is a binary star in the southern constellation of Lupus. It is a visible to the naked eye with a combined apparent visual magnitude of 4.323. Based upon an annual parallax shift of 8.07 mas as seen from Earth, it is located around 400 light-years from the Sun, give or take 30 light-years. At that distance, the visual magnitude of the system is diminished by an extinction factor of  due to interstellar dust. It is a member of the Upper Centaurus–Lupus subgroup of the nearby Scorpius–Centaurus association.

This is a visual binary star system with the components having an angular separation of 0.1 arcsecond. The primary, component A, is a magnitude 4.84 B-type subgiant star with a stellar classification of B5 V. It displays radial velocity variations indicating it has an unseen second companion orbiting at a separation of at least 17 AU with a period of 27 years or more. The spectrum of the primary displays a Zeeman effect indicating a magnetic field with a strength ranging from −94 to 677 G. The visible companion, component B, has a visual magnitude of 5.27.

References

B-type subgiants
Binary stars
Lupus (constellation)
Lupi, Omicron
072683
130807
5528
Durchmusterung objects
Upper Centaurus Lupus